Edmund Elisala Stansbury (born May 3, 1979) is a former professional American football fullback in the National Football League. He attended UCLA, where he was a two-year starter as the team's fullback blocking for Deshaun Foster. His most notable highlight was scoring the game-winning touchdown against the University of Michigan in 2000 at the Rosebowl. Ed was a member of two PAC 10 championships in football and one PAC 10 championship in track and field. He would play with the Houston Texans in 2002. In 2003, he signed a free agent contract with the Seattle Seahawks. In 2004, he was allocated to NFL Europe by the Houston Texans where he was the starting fullback of the World Bowl Championship team Berlin Thunder.

After living in Orange County, CA for 18 years, Ed now resides in El Paso, Texas where he works as an agent with Nationwide Insurance and a football analyst on the NBC affiliate station KTSM NC9 Overtime, President of the El Paso Athletic Hall of Fame (2019 & 2020), Ambassador of the "Go Texan" program and Director of Operations for the Greater El Paso Football Showcase respectively.

External links
Pro-Football reference

1979 births
Living people
American football fullbacks
Berlin Thunder players
Houston Texans players
Irvin High School alumni
Players of American football from El Paso, Texas
UCLA Bruins football players